Cyclophorus may be:

 Cyclophorus (gastropod), a genus of tropical land snails
 Cyclophorus (plant), a genus of ferns